Hydroporus toledoi is a species of beetle native to the Doğu Karadeniz Dağlari in Turkey. Males of this species can be distinguished from H. artvinensis, H. cagrankaya, H. lundbergi and H. sivrikaya by the shape of their aedeagi. Its pro- and mesotarsi are provided with sucker cups.

References

Further reading
Topkara, Esat Tarık, and M. Ruşen Ustaoğlu. "Investigations on the Aquatic Coleoptera (Classis: Insecta) Fauna of some Mountain Lakes in the Eastern Black Sea Range (Turkey)."

External links

Dytiscidae
Beetles described in 2009